The Art of Live is both a live album and DVD by American progressive metal band Queensrÿche.  Both the DVD and CD were recorded during the group's 2003 co-headlining tour (with Dream Theater) in support of Tribe.  The track listing for both releases is nearly identical, although the DVD omits "Anybody Listening?" and includes two cover versions – "Comfortably Numb" (Pink Floyd) and "Won't Get Fooled Again" (The Who) – performed on stage with Dream Theater. The DVD footage is shot entirely in sepia, which disappointed some fans and reviewers.

The album is not generally indicative of the band's setlist from this period, and is instead a compilation which largely highlights recent or acoustic material played on the 2003 tour.

Track listings

Behind the Scenes feature
Interviews
Photo Gallery

Personnel
Band members
Geoff Tate - lead vocals
Michael Wilton - lead guitar
Mike Stone - rhythm guitar, backing vocals
Eddie Jackson - bass, backing vocals
Scott Rockenfield - drums

Additional musicians
Dream Theater - performers on "Won't Get Fooled Again"

Production
Eric Janco - sound engineering, mixing
Eddie Jackson - audio production supervising
Susan Tate - DVD producer, management
Merck Mercuriadis, Jaison John, Dan Russo - Sanctuary Records production

References

2004 live albums
2004 video albums
Live video albums
Queensrÿche live albums
Sanctuary Records live albums
Sanctuary Records video albums
Queensrÿche video albums